The Ray Mancini vs. Bobby Chacon, or, alternatively, Bobby Chacon vs. Ray Mancini fight was a boxing contest which was held on January 14, 1984, in Reno, Nevada. It was for Mancini's WBA's world Lightweight title. Mancini won the fight, to retain his title, by a third-round technical knockout. Because of its location (Reno is often nicknamed "the biggest little city in the world") this fight was promotionally nicknamed as "the biggest little fight in the world". In the United States, the fight was televised on HBO World Championship Boxing, while in Puerto Rico, it was shown live on channel 2.

Prelude

Ray Mancini
Ray "Boom Boom" Mancini was born Raymond Michael Mancino on March 4, 1961, the son of former boxer Lenny Mancini. Ray, from Youngstown, Ohio, fought as a professional for the first time on October 18, 1979, when he beat Phil Bowen by a first-round knockout. Mancini proceeded to build an 18–0, 14 knockout wins record before he challenged Puerto Rican Jorge Morales for Morales' North American Boxing Federation's Lightweight title in a bout Mancini won by ninth-round technical knockout on May 16, 1981, earning Mancini his first regional, professional boxing title.

For his first title defense of the regional championship, Mancini met Mexican Jose Luis Ramirez, a future two-time WBC world Lightweight champion. Going into their July 19, 1981 contest, Ramirez had 71 wins and 3 defeats in 74 professional fights, but Mancini beat him comprehensively to earn a 12 rounds unanimous decision victory, setting the Italian-American for a challenge of the then WBC world Lightweight champion, Nicaragua's Alexis Arguello. Mancini was 20–0, with 15 wins by knockout when he faced Arguello, who was 67–5 in 72 bouts, for the Nicaraguan's WBC world Lightweight title in Mancini's first world championship fight. He lost to Arguello by a 14th-round knockout on Saturday, October 3, 1981, at the Bally's Park Place hotel and Casino of Atlantic City, New Jersey, in a contest that was refereed by Tony Perez. Mancini gave a good account of himself as he was losing the bout on the three judges' scorecards at the time of the stoppage, but only by 2, 3 and 5 points on the cards. Arguello and Mancini became friends right after their bout had finished and Arguello himself predicted to Mancini that Mancini would become a world  champion in the future.

Mancini then defended his NABF title twice successfully before receiving his second world title shot, this time against WBA world champion Art Frias. Frias-Mancini was held on May 8, 1982. Mancini-Frias is considered by many boxing experts, including Ring Magazine's writer Lee Groves, as one of the greatest one-round fights in the sport's history. Frias shook Mancini badly early in the round and bloodied the Ohioan challenger's nose, but Mancini roared back to drop the champion and force a stoppage by referee Richard Green at 2:57 of the round, thus becoming the WBA world Lightweight champion.

Mancini defended his title once (against former WBA world lightweight champion Ernesto Espana of Venezuela) before meeting South Korean challenger Duk Koo Kim for his second title defense, in what proved to be a tragic fight. Fought at the Caesar's Palace hotel and casino in Las Vegas, Nevada on November 13, 1982, and also refereed by Richard Green, the fight was a brisk-paced event until its conclusion in round 14, when Mancini landed a combination that dropped Kim near the ring's ropes. Kim got up but the fight was immediately stopped. Kim later collapsed and was taken to a nearby hospital, where he ultimately died on November 17. Both Kim's mother and referee Green committed suicide on the months after the bout, and Mancini had a personal bout with depression. In addition, the death of Kim led to the WBC shortening their world championship fights from 15 rounds to 12, a move that was later followed by all other boxing world leading organizations (the WBA, the IBF and the WBO).

1983 was a difficult year for Mancini: not only did he battle depression, but a proposed "super-fight" with fellow Ohioan, the WBA world Jr. Welterweight champion Aaron Pryor, proved impossible to make. After Pryor had defended his championship by knocking out Arguello in round 14 at the Orange Bowl Stadium in Miami, Florida in another HBO World Championship Boxing show telecast which took place  the night prior to the tragic Mancini-Kim encounter, a cheating scandal concerning a bottle used by Pryor's trainer, Panama Lewis, during various breaks in the contest ensued, and Pryor was ordered to fight Arguello a second time (Pryor repeated his win over Arguello, the second time by tenth-round knockout). Pryor announced what was ultimately a temporary retirement right after the Arguello rematch, and Mancini was left without the potential Mancini-Pryor super-fight in his future. Also, he was able to defend his WBA world Lightweight title only once that year, knocking out Peruvian challenger Orlando Romero in nine rounds on September 15. The one positive note to Mancini's 1983 boxing campaign was that the Romero contest marked Mancini's debut as a fighter in the world famous New York City's Madison Square Garden. Mancini finished 1983 with a win over an over-matched opponent, the 12 wins, 11 losses trial-horse Johnny Torres of Homestead, Florida, in a non-championship, 10 rounds Jr. Welterweight fight that formed part of the Larry Holmes versus Marvis Frazier fight's undercard that also took place at the Caesars Palace hotel in Las Vegas, on November 25. This undercard was promoted by a newcomer into boxing promoting named Robert Andreoli, a fact which set up the wheels in motion for the major promotion and program that the Mancini-Chacon match-up represented at the time. Mancini was, at this point of his career, 28–1 with 22 of those wins coming by knockout before facing Chacon.

Bobby Chacon
Bobby "Schoolboy" Chacon (November 28, 1951 – September 7, 2016) was a Mexican-American professional boxer from Pacoima, California whose official professional boxing debut is recorded by Boxrec.com as having taken place on April 17, 1972, versus undefeated, 7-0 prospect Jose Antonio Rosa at the Inglewood Forum in Inglewood, California with Chacon prevailing by a fifth-round knockout of a contest that was part of an undercard headed by Jerry Quarry's meeting with Eduardo Corletti (there is some confusion as whether this was Chacon's debut as a professional boxer or not, as boxrec also has documented a fight on January 1 of the same year versus Modesto Boy Dayaganon-a second-round knockout win for Chacon-as a professional fight)

 
Chacon set a torrid pace as a professional fighter, building a record of 18–0 with 16 wins by knockout as well as a considerable fan base, before facing former world Bantamweight champion Chucho Castillo on April 28, 1973, at the Inglewood Forum, Chacon defeating Castillo by tenth-round knockout. This win set up a match against arch-rival Ruben Olivares.

The first of three fights between Chacon and former world Bantamweight and Featherweight (and also future, in the Featherweights) champion Olivares took place on June 23, 1973, at the Inglewood Forum and was contested for Olivares' regional, NABF Featherweight title. Olivares had won 71, lost 3 and drawn (tied) 1 of his 75 professional boxing fights. Olivares inflicted Chacon's first loss as a professional boxer by beating the Californian by a ninth-round technical knockout.

Chacon got back on the winning columns with four consecutive knockout victories before a widely awaited-for match-up with cross-town rival, undefeated, 23-0 hard-punching Danny "Little Red" Lopez was set-up, this time at the Los Angeles Sports Arena in Los Angeles, on May 24, 1974. Chacon dominated Lopez, building leads of four rounds (on two of the judges' scorecards) and five rounds on the other scorecard before stopping the Utah native but California residing Lopez in round nine.

The win versus WBC world-ranked Lopez, himself a future WBC world Featherweight champion, made Chacon a challenger for the WBC world Featherweight title, which at that time was vacant, and for which Chacon fought versus Venezuela's Alfredo Marcano. Chacon became a world champion for the first time when he stopped Marcano,a former WBA world Jr. Lightweight champion who was 43-9-3 in 55 contests, in nine rounds at the Olympic Auditorium in Los Angeles, September 7, 1974.

Chacon defended the WBC world Featherweight championship successfully once before facing Olivares in a rematch on June 20, 1975, at the Inglewood Forum. Once again, Olivares, by then 79-5-1 in 85 previous fights, proved to be Chacon's better by dropping the defending champion twice in the second round before the contest was stopped in that round.

Chacon next beat Fel Clemente before the beginning of his four fight rivalry with Rafael "Bazooka" Limon. On December 7, 1975, Chacon first faced future two time WBC world Jr. Lightweight champion Limon in what also constituted Chacon's first fight abroad, held at the Plaza de Toros Calafia in Mexicali, Mexico. Limon outpointed Chacon over ten rounds, winning (Limon) by a ten rounds unanimous judges' decision.

Chacon proceeded after the first fight with Limon by winning his next nine contests, eight of them by knockout, before facing Ruben Olivares in a rubber match. Chacon-Olivares III was a ten rounds fight with no world titles at stake. It took place on August 20, 1977, at the Inglewood Forum, and Chacon was able to avenge his two earlier defeats at the hands of the legendary Mexican boxer by outpointing him over ten rounds, winning by a somewhat close but convincing unanimous decision. The win in the third fight with Olivares was followed by a loss in an upset against 20-14-2 Arizonan Arturo Leon, a ten rounds split decision defeat that happened on November 15, 1977, at the Convention Center in Anaheim.

Chacon recuperated from the loss to Leon by posting four wins, three by knockout, in a row before facing Limon in their second fight, this time with the NABF Jr. Lightweight championship on the line. Chacon-Limon II was fought at the L.A. Sports Arena on April 9, 1979. The fight was declared a technical draw (tie) after seven rounds because Chacon had hit Limon with an unintentional head-butt and California State Athletic Commission's rules at the time dictated that, despite Chacon being leading on the judges' scorecards in the contest, since he caused the head-butt, the fight had to be declared a tie. That rule has since been rescinded by all athletic commissions in the United States.

Chacon then had a victory against Jose Torres (not to be confused with the Puerto Rican world Light Heavyweight champion and International Boxing Hall of Fame member of the same name), before fighting Alexis Arguello in a bid to become a two-division world boxing champion, for Arguello's WBC world Jr. Lightweight title, on November 16, 1979, at the L.A. Forum. Chacon was actually leading the fight by one point on two of the judges' three scorecards before losing by a seventh-round technical knockout due to a cut which was caused by a punch connected by the Nicaraguan.

Following the title fight loss to Arguello, Chacon and Limon retook their rivalry. Contest number three between the two rivals took place on Friday, March 21, 1980, at the Inglewood Forum, with Chacon scoring his first victory over Limon, by a ten rounds split decision, with two judges deeming him a winner by one point each, and one judge giving Limon the contest by two points. Two wins over rather mediocre opposition with combined records of 16 wins, 23 losses and 5 ties came after his first victory over Limon, and then Chacon was allowed to challenge for the WBC's world Jr. Lightweight championship for a second time. This time the world champion was Uganda's Cornelius Boza-Edwards. The two fought a brutal fight on May 30, 1981, at the Showboat Hotel in Las Vegas, Nevada, but Boza-Edwards dominated on his way to retaining the title by a thirteenth-round technical knockout.

Soon afterwards, tragedy touched Chacon's life. His wife Valerie had been clamoring for him to retire from the sport, fearing he could die or suffer brain damage from all his hard contests. She reportedly left him during a period to move to Hawaii and find the Chacons jobs, in hopes that he would fly there to follow her. But Bobby insisted on fighting as a professional, with hopes of becoming a world champion for a second time. Valerie Chacon had returned to California before, on March 15, 1982, reportedly committing suicide with a gunshot to her head. Chacon was in Sacramento for a bout at the city's Memorial Auditorium with Salvador Ugalde the next night. Bobby Chacon beat Ugalde by third-round knockout and was afterwards ranked number one again by the WBC among the world's Junior Lightweights. After the Ugalde contest was over, Chacon tearfully grabbed the Auditorium's public microphone to dedicate the win to his late wife.

Chacon then beat Rosendo Ramirez and Arturo Leon in a rematch, before trading punches with Rafael Limon in their fourth and final installment of their rivalry. Chacon-Limon IV is generally considered to be among the greatest boxing fights of all times by both fans and experts alike, veteran writer Jack Fiske calling it "possibly the greatest fight" he'd ever seen. Fought at the Memorial Auditorium in Sacramento 28 days after Mancini-Kim on December 11, 1982, Chacon-Limon IV was the only fight in their rivalry to be for a world title, as Limon was in his second reign as WBC world Junior Lightweight champion. The bout also has the distinction of being the last WBC contest to be scheduled for 15 rounds, as starting in 1983, and due to the aforementioned Kim tragedy, the WBC limited their fights to 12 rounds only. Chacon was dropped in round three and again in round ten, but he rebounded furiously down the stretch and dropped Limon with ten seconds remaining in the last round in order to secure a close but unanimous decision and win his second division's world championship in Ring Magazine's 1982 fight of the year. Once again, he dedicated his triumph to his late wife Valerie.

Chacon began having problems to defend his second world title almost right away, which indirectly led to his challenge of Mancini. Promoter Don King wanted to offer Chacon $210,000 dollars to fight a relative newcomer in the Jr. Lightweight rankings, King's boxer Hector "Macho" Camacho in San Juan, Puerto Rico in a defense of Chacon's WBC world Junior Lightweight championship. Chacon, however, opted to fight the WBC's number one challenger at the time, his former conqueror and former WBC world champion Cornelius Boza-Edwards, in a rematch bout where Chacon would earn $450,000 dollars instead. Despite Boza-Edwards being ranked number one by the WBC, the Mexico-based organization sided with King and declared that Chacon-Boza Edwards II would not be considered a world championship contest by the WBC and that shall the Ugandan win, the WBC title was going to be declared vacant. Despite all of this, Chacon-Boza Edwards II took place on May 15, 1983, at the Caesars Palace hotel, in a program produced by boxing promoter Don Chargin. Chacon and Boza-Edwards traded knockdowns in another brutal affair, with Chacon dropping the African in rounds one and two before Boza-Edwards almost finished him in the third, dropping Chacon with a left to Chacon's chin. Chacon got up and the two kept fighting at a furious pace until Chacon, for the second fight in a row, scored a last round knockdown (his third knockdown of Boza-Edwards in this contest) to secure a close but unanimous decision win in what was declared Ring Magazine's 1983 fight of the year. Afterwards, Chargin himself offered Chacon a reported $1,000,000 dollars to fight Camacho, but Chacon decided to refuse that offer too. Instead, he left the WBC word Jr. Lightweight title vacant and moved to the Lightweight division, plans for the Chacon-Mancini showdown beginning immediately afterwards. Chacon brought a record of 52 wins, 6 losses and one draw (tie) with 42 of his wins by knockout, into the match.

The fight
Mancini-Chacon earned great interest from fans, writers and boxing magazines right away, in part because Chacon was going to try to join Bob Fitzsimmons, Tony Canzoneri, Barney Ross, Henry Armstrong, Wilfred Benitez, Alexis Arguello and Roberto Duran as the eighth member of the three division world champions club and to become the first Mexican-American (as Duran himself is partly of Mexican blood, on his father's side) to be a member of that club as well as the fourth Hispanic in it. The match was covered by many major sports media outlets, such as Sports Illustrated magazine.
As the first major world title fight of 1984, it was held on January 14 of that year, at the Lawlor Events Center in Reno. Jimmy Lennon was the fight's ring announcer and Barry Tompkins, Larry Merchant and fellow legendary boxer and world champion Sugar Ray Leonard worked the HBO telecast, while Junior Abrams commented on the fight for Puerto Rico's channel 2. The bout's referee was Richard Steele. Promoted by Robert Andreoli, the match was sponsored by Budweiser beer, which at the time was a sponsor of many major boxing events.

The two competitors set into a jabbing contest at first, during the first seconds of round one. Mancini's jab, however-including a hard left jab about twenty seconds into the round-were landing harder. Chacon landed a nice one-two left and right hook combination but Mancini was not noticeably hurt by it. Halfway through the round, Mancini landed a right hook that slightly buckled Chacon's legs. Chacon gave way and moved to the ropes with Mancini following him. Chacon was able to battle his way out and back to ring center but a combination by Mancini sent him back along the ropes, where they both traded furiously and on seemingly even terms until Chacon landed a solid left hook to Mancini's right side's rib area. Not wanting to let Chacon take the offensive, Mancini responded by landing two lefts of his own, one a hook to the body and the other a cross to the chin. Mancini added two more hooks, a left and a right one, to the body, and a few more jabs before the pair traded on even terms to end the round.

Mancini started round two with a strong left jab to Chacon's face. He then landed a right hook to Chacon's chin that staggered Chacon, who went to the ropes, where Mancini landed another huge right, hurting Chacon and then doubling him over in pain. Another right almost finished the Mexican-American challenger but he bravely stayed on his feet, refusing to go down. Chacon tried moving, but was immediately trapped against the ropes again in another side of the ring, Mancini bombarding him with rights and lefts. By then, referee Steele was observing the combatants closely, ready to step in and stop the contest at any moment. But Chacon started firing back to defend himself. Chacon at one point of the round landed a hard uppercut to Mancini's chin, momentarily snapping the defending world champion's head back, but Mancini kept on the attack, not letting Chacon leave his position against the ropes. Mancini and Chacon kept landing hard punches in a chest to chest confrontation. Mancini's punches, however, seemed to have more power than Chacon's. Chacon was finally able to momentarily leave the ropes but only after another left and right combination by Mancini had snapped his head back. Chacon spent the last one minute of round two again pitted against the ropes with Mancini landing two more huge left hooks. After round two, the two competitors, sportingly and out of respect to each other, touched gloves.

Soon after round three had started, Mancini landed two more, very hard right hooks that sent Chacon to the ropes. Mancini followed and attacked again. Chacon courageously tried fighting back but was overpowered, Steele again observing very closely. Then, with 2 minutes and 13 seconds left in the round, Mancini landed a tremendous left to the chin that left Chacon teetering and in bad condition. Mancini threw eleven punches in a row before Chacon could answer with a right. Chacon tried with one final shootout exchange with the champion where he threw as many punches as Mancini before two rights by the Italian-American again made Chacon's knees buckle, at which moment Steele motioned his arms as if he was going to stop the match then. But the referee let the fight continue until Mancini connected five or six more blows. Steele then stepped in and stopped the fight, with Mancini retaining the WBA world Lightweight title by a third-round technical knockout. Chacon immediately thanked Steele on camera for the stoppage.

After the fight
This turned out to be Mancini's last professional boxing victory. Next, he lost the WBA world Lightweight title to Livingstone Bramble by a fourteenth-round technical knockout on June 1 of 1984 at Buffalo, New York, before returning to the Lawlor Events Center in Reno for a return match with Bramble in another HBO World Championship Boxing telecast, a match which Mancini lost by a close but unanimous 15 rounds decision. Mancini then retired but he returned for a fight versus Hector Camacho for the WBO's vacant world Jr. Welterweight championship in what was the WBO's inaugural world title fight at that division, on Monday, March 6, 1989, once again, at the Lawlor Events Center in Reno, with the Puerto Rican  winning a somewhat controversial split decision over Mancini. Mancini retired one  more time, but he returned again in 1992, for a pay per view fight against multiple time world champion Greg Haugen, for the vacant NABF Jr. Welterweight championship on April 3, with the winner offered a world championship fight versus WBC world Jr. welterweight champion Julio Cesar Chavez Gonzalez. Mancini lost that bout by a seventh-round knockout to finish his career with a four fight losing streak and a record of 29 wins and 5 losses with 23 wins  and 3 losses by knockout. Mancini became an actor and film producer who appeared in a number of films. and television boxing match commentator.

Chacon did not fare much better. Boxing career-wise, he did win his final seven contests after the Mancini match, including victories against Freddie Roach, Art Frias and Rafi Solis, but he was arrested soon after the Mancini match later in 1984, accused of beating his then wife Melissa, (they later divorced, Chacon married twice more) and suffered the tragic loss of his son Bobby Chacon Jr., who was murdered in 1991 at age 17, while losing all the money he earned as a boxer and living at different places, including his mother's house and a desolate motel. He collected cans for resale in order to make some money. He suffered from pugilistic dementia towards the end of his life, a condition which had been detected by as early as 1999. Chacon died on September 7, 2016, after suffering a fall at a hospice where he was residing in Hemet, California. Chacon's final professional boxing record was of 59 wins, 7 defeats and 1 tie (draw) in 67 officially recorded matches, with 47 of those wins and 5 of the losses coming by knockout.

The fight between Mancini and Chacon was commemorated on a song by singer Warren Zevon, 1987's "Boom Boom Mancini", which was inspired by the match. Part of that song's lyrics read "Hurry home early hurry on home
Boom Boom Mancini's fighting Bobby Chacon".

Both Mancini and Chacon are members of the International Boxing Hall of Fame, with Chacon inducted in 2005, and Mancini's induction taking place exactly ten years later, during 2015.

References

1984 in boxing
Boxing in Nevada
Boxing matches
Boxing on HBO
1984 in sports in Nevada